Colobothea lateralis is a species of beetle in the family Cerambycidae. It was described by Bates in 1865. It is known from Brazil.

References

lateralis
Beetles described in 1865